Scopula extimaria is a moth of the  family Geometridae. It is found in northern India.

References

Moths described in 1861
extimaria
Moths of Asia